Adelard (also spelled Adelhard, Adalhard or Adalard) may refer to:

People in the Middle Ages
Adelard, father of the Frankish saint Herlindis of Maaseik (died 745)
Adalard of Corbie (751–827), Frankish abbot
Adelard of Spoleto (died 824), Italian nobleman
Adalard the Seneschal, 9th-century Frankish nobleman
Adalhard of Metz (c. 840–890), Frankish nobleman
Adalard of Paris (c. 830–890), Frankish nobleman
Adalhard of Babenberg (died 903), Frankish nobleman
Adelard of Ghent, 11th-century biographer of Saint Dunstan
Adelard of Bath (c. 1080?–c. 1142–1152?), English scholar

Canadians since the 19th century
Adélard Godbout (1892–1956), Canadian politician
Adélard Turgeon (1863–1930), Canadian lawyer and politician
Adélard Langevin (1855–1915), Canadian archbishop and priest
Adélard Bellemare (1871–1933), Canadian politician
Adélard Lafrance (1912–1995), Canadian ice hockey player
Adélard Laurendeau (1883-1968), Canadian politician

See also
Adelardo (disambiguation)

Masculine given names